A concussion is a type of traumatic brain injury.

Concussion may also refer to:

Music

 Concussion Ensemble, a 1992 American rock group

Media

 Concussion (album), a 2001 album by Matthew Ryan
 Concussion (2013 film), an independent drama film with LGBT themes starring Robin Weigert
 Concussion (2015 film), a sports drama film starring Will Smith

Military

 Concussion grenade, a type of hand grenade

See also

 Phonon noise

fr:commotion